Maureen Hunter (born 1948) is a Canadian playwright who lives on the Salish Sea at Sechelt, BC.
Hunter was born in Indian Head, Saskatchewan and graduated from the University of Saskatchewan. Throughout her professional career, she lived in Winnipeg, Manitoba.  Most of her plays were premiered by the Royal Manitoba Theatre Company.  They have been performed in theatres across Canada, as well as in the U.S. and Britain. Transit of Venus was performed by the Royal Shakespeare Company and recorded by the BBC. An opera version of Transit of Venus premiered at Manitoba Opera in 2007. Her plays have been published by Scirocco Drama and Nuage Editions and are available through good bookstores and on Amazon. She is a member of the Playwrights Guild of Canada.

Works
Poor Uncle Ernie in his Covered Cage - 1986
I Met a Bully on the Hill - co-author 1986
The Queen of Queen Street - 1987
Footprints on the Moon - 1988 (nominated for a Governor General's Award)
Beautiful Lake Winnipeg - 1990
Transit of Venus - 1992
Atlantis - 1996 (nominated for a Governor General's Award)
Vinci - 2002
Wild Mouth  - 2008
.  Sarah Ballenden - 2017

See also
List of Canadian writers
List of Canadian playwrights

References

1948 births
Living people
Canadian women dramatists and playwrights
Writers from Saskatchewan
20th-century Canadian dramatists and playwrights
21st-century Canadian dramatists and playwrights
20th-century Canadian women writers
21st-century Canadian women writers